Rockbank is a suburb in Melbourne, Victoria, Australia,  west of the Melbourne central business district, located within the City of Melton local government area. Rockbank recorded a population of 2,583 at the 2021 census.

Rockbank Post Office opened on 1 January 1862.

The area lies east of the satellite city of Melton and west of the suburb of Caroline Springs. The land contains many large volcanic rocks making it poor for cultivating crops. The rocks have been used to build walls between paddocks – characteristic of the area west of Melbourne. Mount Cottrell is the highest land point in the vicinity.

Rockbank railway station is on the Serviceton line. Rockbank is also served by Public Transport Victoria bus route 456 which runs along the Western Freeway, linking Melton and Sunshine.

The rich, red volcanic soil in the area has helped build the reputation of local wineries. Rockbank is also the host to Victoria's annual Olive Festival. The earlier agricultural activities date back to the pastoral exploits of William Cross Yuille on the plains.

The town has an Australian rules football team, competing in the Riddell District Football League and a netball team. Rockbank also has a K-6 school named Rockbank Primary School.

Following a proposal for eleven new suburbs by the City of Melton, the northern portion of Rockbank became the suburb of Aintree.

See also

 Kororoit Creek
 Kororoit Creek Trail

References

Suburbs of Melbourne
Suburbs of the City of Melton